The white-whiskered laughingthrush or Formosan laughing thrush (Trochalopteron morrisonianum) is a species of bird in the family Leiothrichidae. It is endemic to montane forests of the island of Taiwan.

Description
The bill is thrush-like and yellowish to horn-colored. The eyes are black. The legs are strong and brownish pink.

It is a sociable species that often occurs in large groups. It is not necessarily afraid of humans.

Habitat and ecology
It can enter open areas by roadsides and in forest clearings. In the Yushan National Park, it was more abundant in mixed coniferous forest than in grassland, pine woodland, or spruce forest; along with Taiwan fulvetta (Fulvetta formosana) and Taiwan yuhina (Yuhina brunneiceps), it was a dominant species in that habitat. It is a ground omnivore.

Conservation
White-whiskered laughingthrush is a somewhat common species in Taiwan, with an estimated population size between 10,000 and 100,000 breeding pairs. Although its population is believed to be decreasing because of habitat destruction and fragmentation, it is not considered a vulnerable species.

References

white-whiskered laughingthrush
Endemic birds of Taiwan
white-whiskered laughingthrush
Taxonomy articles created by Polbot
Taxobox binomials not recognized by IUCN